Doddiana is a genus of snout moths. It was described by Alfred Jefferis Turner in 1902.

Species
Doddiana analamalis Viette, 1960
Doddiana callizona Lower, 1896
Doddiana cyanifusalis Marion, 1955
Doddiana tonkinalis Viette, 1960

References

Epipaschiinae
Pyralidae genera